Amanda Newton (born 8 April 1977) is a former England netball international. She was a member of the England teams that won bronze medals at the 1998 Commonwealth Games and at the 1999 World Netball Championships. She captained England at the 2007 World Netball Championships. Between 2001 and 2010 she played in seven senior finals and won four national titles with three different teams – London Tornadoes, Northern Thunder and Mavericks.

Early life and education
Newton is originally from the Forest Gate/Newham area of East London. She attended St Angela's Ursuline School and Sixth Form where she first began to play netball seriously. In her youth Newton played for the Plaistow-based Old Plaistovians Association. She also played for Essex and East of England at county and regional level  and represented Newham in the London Youth Games.

Playing career

Clubs
Capital Shakers
In 1999, Newton played for Capital Shakers in New Zealand's Coco-Cola Cup. Her Shakers team mates included Jodi Te Huna, Noeline Taurua, Debbie Fuller and fellow England international, Olivia Murphy.

Super Cup
During the Super Cup era, Newton played for both London Tornadoes and Northern Thunder. She played in three successive Super Cup finals and on each occasion finished on the winning side. She helped Tornadoes win the Super Cup in 2001 and 2003 and Thunder win it in 2002.

Mavericks
Newton played for Mavericks in the Netball Superleague. She played for Mavericks in four grand finals and was player of the match when they won the 2008 grand final. Her Mavericks team mates included Louisa Brownfield and Karen Atkinson.

England
Between 1996 and 2008 Newton made 100 senior England appearances. She made her senior debut against Jamaica. She was a member of the England teams that won bronze medals at the 1998 Commonwealth Games and at the 1999 World Netball Championships. Newton missed the 2003 and 2004 international seasons with a cruciate ligament injury. In 2006 she was appointed England captain and she subsequently  captained the team at the 2007 World Netball Championships.

Coaching career
PE teacher
While still an active player, Newton worked as a netball coach for Chigwell School. She has subsequently worked as a PE teacher/netball coach at Godolphin and Latymer School, Blackheath High School and Jumeirah English Speaking School.

Netball Superleague
Newton has worked as an assistant coach and defensive specialist with both Hertfordshire Mavericks and Loughborough Lightning in the Netball Superleague. She was also head coach of future Netball Superleague franchise, 
London Pulse as they prepared to join the league.

England
Newton has helped coach England at both senior and youth levels. She was a member of Tracey Neville's coaching staff at the 2015 Netball World Cup, helping the team win a bronze medal. She also coached an England youth team which toured New Zealand in 2017.

Honours
Mavericks
Netball Superleague
Winners: 2007–08: 1
Runners up: 2005–06, 2006–07, 2008–09, 2009–10: 4
London Tornadoes 
Super Cup
Winners: 2001, 2003: 2
Northern Thunder 
Super Cup
Winners: 2002: 1

References

1977 births
Living people
English netball players
English netball coaches
Commonwealth Games bronze medallists for England
Netball players at the 1998 Commonwealth Games
Netball players at the 2002 Commonwealth Games
Commonwealth Games medallists in netball
Capital Shakers players
Netball Superleague players
AENA Super Cup players
Manchester Thunder players
Mavericks netball players
Sportspeople from London
English expatriate netball people in New Zealand
English expatriate sportspeople in the United Arab Emirates
Schoolteachers from Essex
1999 World Netball Championships players
Schoolteachers from London
Medallists at the 1998 Commonwealth Games